Pirx is a 90 km (55.9 miles) wide impact crater on Pluto's natural satellite Charon, discovered in 2015 by the American New Horizons probe. The crater is located near Charon's north pole.

Crater Pirx is named after Pilot Pirx, the main character in a series of short stories by Stanislaw Lem. The name was approved by the International Astronomical Union in 2018.

See also 
 List of geological features on Charon

References

Impact craters on Charon
New Horizons
Commemoration of Stanisław Lem